Prenuptial Agreement is the sixth studio album by American rapper J. Stalin. It was released on January 12, 2010 via SMC Recordings. Production was handled by Adam "Swerve" Trujillo, the Mekanix, Mike Rizmo, Cinematik, DJ Fresh, Jallah Keys, Joe Millionaire, Kareem K, SK, Sneaky Mike, Traxamillion and Troy "Tha Rolla" Sanders. It features guest appearances from Shady Nate, 211, E Da Singa, Lil' Blood, E-40, Dubb 20, Glasses Malone, Jallah Keys, Jay Jonah, Lil' Kev, Lil Retro, Matt Blaque, Messy Marv, Mistah F.A.B., Philthy Rich, San Quinn, SK, Stevie Joe, The Jacka and Too $hort. The album peaked at #71 on the Top R&B/Hip-Hop Albums chart and at #18 on the Heatseekers Albums chart.

Critical reception

Prenuptial Agreement was met with generally favorable reviews from critics. At Album of the Year, which assigns a normalized rating out of 100 to reviews from mainstream publications, the album received an average score of 70 based on three reviews.

Track listing

References

2010 albums
J. Stalin albums
SMC Recordings albums